Echinopora fruticulosa is a species of stony coral in the family Merulinidae.

Description
The basic color of these corals is pinkish-brown with pale corallites.

Distribution and habitat

References 

Merulinidae
Corals described in 1879